David D'Auria (born 26 March 1970) is a Welsh football midfielder. He was born in Swansea, and played for Football League clubs in both Wales and England. D'Auria helped Barry Town win the Welsh Cup in 1994, scoring the opening goal in the final against Cardiff City.

D'Auria has been the first Team manager of Garden Village FC, who are based in Swansea having been appointed in June 2017.

References

Welsh Premier League Profile for David D'Auria

1970 births
Living people
Welsh footballers
Swansea City A.F.C. players
Merthyr Tydfil F.C. players
Scarborough F.C. players
Scunthorpe United F.C. players
Hull City A.F.C. players
Chesterfield F.C. players
Barry Town United F.C. players
Footballers from Swansea
Welsh people of Italian descent
Association football midfielders
Garden Village A.F.C. managers
Welsh football managers
Skewen Athletic F.C. players
Neath F.C. players
Llanelli Town A.F.C. players